Pleasant City may refer to:

Pleasant City, Ohio, United States
Pleasant City (West Palm Beach), United States
Palmerston North, New Zealand